Sergei Sergeyevich Yashin (born 3 January 1981) is a former Russian footballer.

Career
Sports School alumnus  Zarya  and CYSS  Torpedo (Kaluga). First coach   Mikhail Ivanovich Strykov.

Yashin professional football career began at the Moscow  Dynamo. The first 3 years he played for the reserves. Since 2001 began to play for the first team. Debuted June 24, 2001, in a match of the 14th round of the championship of Russia against the Voronezh  Fakel.  June 28, 2006 joined the Moscow region  Saturn. Since 2008, played in  Shinnik. In 2010, he moved to Nizhny Novgorod Volga. In 2012, he signed a contract with Daugava Daugavpils, which became the first foreign club in his career. In 2013, he was released.

From August 2014, he is  a player of FC  Dolgoprudny. Since 2015  of FC Domodedovo.

Personal life
He is married and has a daughter, Mila.
Idols in football - Zinedine Zidane and Lionel Messi.

External links
  Player page on the official FC Shinnik Yaroslavl website
 

1981 births
Sportspeople from Kaluga
Living people
Russian footballers
Association football midfielders
FC Dynamo Moscow players
FC Saturn Ramenskoye players
FC Shinnik Yaroslavl players
Russian Premier League players
FC Volga Nizhny Novgorod players
FC Daugava players
Expatriate footballers in Latvia
Russian expatriates in Latvia
FC Olimp-Dolgoprudny players